West Marks is an unincorporated community in Quitman County, Mississippi, United States. West Marks is located on U.S. Route 278 and Mississippi Highway 6 west of Marks.

References

Unincorporated communities in Quitman County, Mississippi
Unincorporated communities in Mississippi